Donosti Gipuzkoa Basket 2001 Saskibaloi Kirol Elkartea S.A.D., commonly known as Gipuzkoa Basket and as Acunsa GBC for sponsorship reasons, is a professional basketball club based in San Sebastián, Gipuzkoa, Spain. The team plays in the LEB Oro. Their home arena is Donostia Arena.

History
Gipuzkoa Basket started competing in LEB 2, third tier. After a first season where the club finished in 11th position out of sixteen teams, it ceased in activity until 2004, when it came back to LEB 2.

In the 2004–05 LEB 2 season, despite finishing in the second position of the regular season, Gipuzkoa BC was eliminated in the quarterfinals of the promotion playoffs by Ciudad de La Laguna. After this come back to competition, Gipuzkoa BC bought the place in Liga LEB, second tier, to CB Ciudad de Algeciras.

Bruesa GBC only needed one season in LEB to achieve promotion Liga ACB. The team finished the regular season in the sixth position but performed a perfect playoff (7–0) to win the league.

The 2006–07 ACB season was not good for the club and could not remain in the league after only winning eight of the 34 games. Porfirio Fisac finished his era in the club after two consecutive promotions.

Despite this failure, Bruesa GBC, this time with Pablo Laso as coach, obtained again the promotion after beating Tenerife Rural in the final game by 81–76 in Cáceres.

The second era in Liga ACB was much better, and the club had not too much problems to remain in the league. The 2011–12 season, just after Pablo Laso signed with Real Madrid, would be the best one in the history of the club, qualifying for the first time to play the Copa del Rey, where the team was defeated in the quarterfinals by Caja Laboral, and the playoffs, not being able to beat Valencia Basket.

A drastic cut in the public subvention to the club, forced Gipuzkoa to resign to play in the Eurocup. From 2012 to 2016 the club decreased its performances and was relegated to LEB Oro in three of the following four seasons, but remained in the league due to the not ability of the second-tier teams to fulfill the requirements to join the ACB League.

In July 2016, after its third relegation and only winning seven games of the 2015–16 season, the board of directors agreed to register GBC in the LEB Oro, thus rejecting the invitation to play again in Liga ACB. With this decision, GBC came back to its old pavilion Polideportivo Municipal José Antonio Gasca, instead of playing again at Illumbe bullring. In its third season at LEB Oro, it achieved a third promotion to the top tier after ending as league champions.

Two years after promoting, GBC suffered a new relegation to LEB Oro. In its fourth season, the club achieved its first Copa Princesa de Asturias after three participations, by beating away Carramimbre CBC Valladolid.

Sponsorship naming
Gipuzkoa Basket has had several denominations through the years due to its sponsorship:

Home arenas
José Antonio Gasca (2001–06, 2016–2017, 2019–2020)
Donostia Arena (2006–2016, 2017–2019, 2020–present)

Players

Current roster

Depth chart

Coaches

Aitor Uriondo: 2001–02
Porfirio Fisac: 2004–07
Pablo Laso: 2007–11
Sito Alonso: 2011–14
Jaume Ponsarnau: 2014–15
Porfirio Fisac: 2015–2018
Sergio Valdeolmillos: 2018–2019
Marcelo Nicola: 2019–2021
Lolo Encinas: 2021–present

Season by season

Trophies and awards

Trophies
Liga Española de Baloncesto: (3)
2006, 2017, 2020
Runners-up (1): 2008
Copa Princesa de Asturias: (1)
2020

Individual awards
ACB Most Valuable Player
Andy Panko – 2012

All-ACB First Team
Andy Panko – 2012
Sergi Vidal – 2012
Henk Norel – 2018

ACB Best Young Player Award
Dani Díez – 2015

Notable players

Notes

References

External links

Gipuzkoa Basket at ACB.COM 

 
Basque basketball teams
Basketball teams established in 2001
Sports teams in San Sebastián
Liga ACB teams
Former LEB Oro teams